The Access For Learning Community, or A4L, is a global, not-for-profit corporation committed to providing solutions in the education data space and supporting the use of standards by schools, districts, states, countries, and education vendors. It has regional chapters in the US, UK, AU, and New Zealand.

It was formerly known as the Schools Interoperability Framework Association, or SIFA. The name was changed in May 2015.

A4L members collaborate on a variety of technical standards sometimes collectively known as the Schools Interoperability Framework.   A4L publishes these standards, and advocates their adoption and provides training and support services.  It also offers an SIF Certification trademark licensing program.  The name change to Access For Learning (A4L) represents a shift to a more solution oriented vision rather than merely advocating for the SIF specification- including using multiple standards to solve school and district problems.

The organization includes more than 1000 members as of 2015, including government agencies, school districts, public advocacy organization and vendors of Schools Interoperability Framework products.

History

Founded as a working group for "Schools Interoperability Framework" in 1997 by vendors under the auspices of the Software and Information Industry Association. In April 2003, SIFA was incorporated and  activities within SIF project of the SIIA were transferred to the current corporation. On May 20, 2015 the name of the organization was changed to the Access For Learning Community, as an indicator of a new emphasis on being over all solutions-oriented for the community rather than strictly advocating the SIF specification.

Organization
A4L Members elect officials every year for terms on the Association's Board of Directors. There is a global Board of Directors and a Management Board for each region supported by the  community- the US, UK, AU and New Zealand.  
Likewise each region has a Technical Board. Each regional Technical Board is composed of the Lead of each A4L Project Team and Task Force and four members elected At-Large by the membership. The A4L Technical Board Members serve a one-year term.

Members
A4L members collaborate on a variety of technical standards sometimes collectively known as the Schools Interoperability Framework (or "SIF").

See also
Schools Interoperability Framework

References

External links
Official website
Student Data Privacy Consortium (SDPC) Website

Standards organizations in the United States
Standards organizations